In mathematics, especially functional analysis, a hypercyclic operator on a Banach space X is a bounded linear operator T: X → X such that there is a vector x ∈ X such that the sequence {Tn x: n = 0, 1, 2, …} is dense in the whole space X. In other words, the smallest closed invariant subset containing x is the whole space. Such an x is then called hypercyclic vector. 
There is no hypercyclic operator in finite-dimensional spaces, but the property of hypercyclicity in spaces of infinite dimension is not a rare phenomenon: many operators are hypercyclic.

The hypercyclicity is a special case of broader notions of topological transitivity (see topological mixing), and universality. Universality in general involves a set of mappings from one topological space to another (instead of a sequence of powers of a single operator mapping from X to X), but has a similar meaning to hypercyclicity. Examples of universal objects were discovered already in 1914 by Julius Pál, in 1935 by Józef Marcinkiewicz, or MacLane in 1952. However, it was not until the 1980s when hypercyclic operators started to be more intensively studied.

Examples 

An example of a hypercyclic operator is two times the backward shift operator on the ℓ2 sequence space, that is the operator, which takes a sequence

(a1, a2, a3, …) ∈ ℓ2

to a sequence

(2a2, 2a3, 2a4, …) ∈ ℓ2.

This was proved in 1969 by Rolewicz.

Known results 

 On every infinite-dimensional separable Banach space there is a hypercyclic operator. On the other hand, there is no hypercyclic operator on a finite-dimensional space, nor on a non-separable Banach space.
 If x is a hypercyclic vector, then Tnx is hypercyclic as well, so there is always a dense set of hypercyclic vectors.
 Moreover, the set of hypercyclic vectors is a connected Gδ set, and always contains a dense vector space, up to {0}.
  constructed an operator on ℓ1, such that all the non-zero vectors are hypercyclic, providing a counterexample to the invariant subspace problem (and even invariant subset problem) in the class of Banach spaces. The problem, whether such an operator (sometimes called hypertransitive, or orbit transitive) exists on a separable Hilbert space, is still open (as of 2014).

References

See also 

 Topological mixing

Functional analysis
Operator theory
Invariant subspaces